Taxi, Mister is a 1943 American comedy film directed by Kurt Neumann and written by Earle Snell and Clarence Marks. The film stars William Bendix, Grace Bradley, Joe Sawyer, Sheldon Leonard, Joe Devlin, Jack Norton, Frank Faylen, Mike Mazurki, Sig Arno, Clyde Fillmore, Jimmy Conlin, Lew Kelly and Iris Adrian. The film was released on April 16, 1943, by United Artists.

This was the third and last of the so-called Taxi Comedies series, which featured Bendix, Sawyer, and Bradley playing the same characters. The first two films were Brooklyn Orchid and The McGuerins from Brooklyn.

Plot

Cast  
 William Bendix as Tim McGuerin
 Grace Bradley as Sadie McGuerin aka O'Brien
 Joe Sawyer as Eddie Corbett
 Sheldon Leonard as Gangster Louis Glorio / The Frisco Ghost
 Joe Devlin as Henchman Stretch
 Jack Norton as Reginald Van Nostrum
 Frank Faylen as Henchman Silk
 Mike Mazurki as Henchman Joe
 Sig Arno as Henri, Waiter
 Clyde Fillmore as Alderman Hogan
 Jimmy Conlin as Cassidy
 Lew Kelly as Man with the Invisible Dog Act
 Iris Adrian as Diner Waitress
 Lona Andre as Chorus Girl

References

External links 
 

1943 films
American black-and-white films
Films directed by Kurt Neumann
United Artists films
1943 comedy films
American comedy films
Films about taxis
Films scored by Edward Ward (composer)
1940s English-language films
1940s American films